Schnirelmann is a surname. Notable people with the surname include:

 Lev Schnirelmann (1905–1938), Soviet mathematician
 Victor Schnirelmann (born 1949), Russian historian

Jewish surnames